Georges Marie Bellenger (19 September 1878 - 22 December 1977) was a French officer and pilot. He trained as a gunner after his acceptance into the École Polytechnique in 1898. Georges Bellenger was very passionate about aviation since his childhood in France at the beginning of the 20th century.

Biography 
Georges Bellenger was born in Évreux to Émile Bellenger, a lawyer, and his wife, Marie Eugénie Aglaé Gibert.

In 1902, he graduated as a Second Lieutenant from the Fontainebleau . He went on assignment to the artillery regiment garrison at Saint-Mihiel. In 1904–1905, one of the articles by Captain Ferdinand Ferber, which appeared in the Revue d'Artillerie, caught his attention and he began to experiment with kites.

As an artillery man, Bellenger had an internship at the Versailles Balloonist Battalion between 1 April 1906 and June 30, 1906. His first ascent took place on April 21, 1906, in a 980 m3 cotton balloon inflated with lighting gas. He obtained the pilot's license for free balloons no. 95 of the Aero Club on October 3, 1907, after making his tenth ascent.

As a free balloon pilot at the start of aerostation, he participated in numerous competitions brilliantly. In particular, he obtained second place in the Aero-Club International Aerial Photography Competition in 1907. He broke the distance record for small cubes on December 8, 1908, by taking a journey that took him from the Aéro-Club park in Saint-Cloud to the Baltic Sea aboard a 600 m3 balloon. He obtained the patent of military balloonist no. 43 on January 30, 1909.

During his stay at the Vincennes military aviation establishment (January 15, 1910, to September 30, 1912), he was under the orders of Lieutenant-Colonel Estienne, who gave him the badge of the knight of the Legion of Honor. Member of the Aero Club of France born in contact with the aviation pioneers such as Ferber, Hubert Latham, and Louis Bleriot. He won the civil pilot's license no. 45 April 25, 1910, and was noted for the Great Maneuvers of 1910 by the quality of his observations: present, General Gallieni immediately promoted him, captain.

In 1910, he took second place in the Grand Prix des Ballons of the Aéro-Club de France: departing from Saint-Cloud, he landed in Austrian Tyrol.

In 1911, as the winner of the Paris-Pau raid, he was accepted in his hometown as a worthy successor to the exploits of Blériot, the designer of his airplane.

In 1912, Captain Bellenger received an appointment to install and direct an aviation school at the Avord camp, near Bourges. It formed the squadron no. 3, which, during the war, became the famous Storks Escadrille.

In 1913, after reception at the war school, he left for three months to the Balkans "to compare facts and doctrines." The report he drew first provoked hilarity, but the information came to confirm his observations and earned him a letter of satisfaction for his real qualities of view. However, there followed mixed evaluations from his teachers at the war school: "Bellenger: intelligent and sympathetic, - unfortunately had too many personal ideas to be specific to the collective work of a General Staff."

A promoter of aerial photography, his information contributed to the victory of the Marne in 1914.

On September 1, 1914, he took command of the Aviation of the sixth Army whose intervention at the battle of Ourcq was most effective and where he had the opportunity to organize artillery observation by plane, then the aerial photo of the front, before being made available to the aeronautical directorate of the Ministry of War.

Not wanting to stay away from the action, he went, at his request, into the artillery from May 1915 to August 1918, during which time he was seriously injured. He ended the war with six quotes.

In 1939, mobilized at his request (he was 61 years old), he took charge of a regiment of anti-tank batteries for the RGA (General Artillery Reserve). He took the opportunity to inspect the front between Longwy and Valenciennes. His observations allowed him to propose a strategy to stop the German advance to the general staff on May 22. In conflict with a conservative team, he returned to forced leave. His strategy would not be implemented until ten days later, but too late and too timidly.

A refugee with his family in Annecy, he corresponded with Lieutenant Théodore Morel (Tom), then chief of the maquis des Glières. He participated in the training of the maquis but expressed his fears to Tom about the concept of fortress plateau as practised in the Vercors, preferring a maquis war. This preparation made it possible to limit the losses significantly during the German attack on the Glières.

Honors and tributes 

 Public education officer (academic palms) on June 16, 1910, at the flying club
 Sports Academy Medal for "Outstanding Aviator Achievements" -January 26, 1911
 Appointed knight in 1911, he was promoted to officer of the Legion of Honor on a military basis in 1920 after redress for injustices (Fayolle Commission) arrested on August 13, 1920)
 Croix de guerre 1914-1918  (Six citations (1 army, 2 CA, 2 DI, 1 regiment))
 Order of the Star of Ethiopia
 Order of the White Eagle (Serbia) - Presentation by King Peter 1 st of Serbia for a demonstration flight in the rain and the wind well narrated by the press
 Military Cross (UK) - awarded on May 31, 1919, probably for his observations for the 1st Battle of the Marne in September 1914
 His name was given to one of the hangars at Évreux aerodrome in 1913.
 On this aerodrome, which became a base 105 in 1944, a new hangar "Halte aerial Bellenger" was inaugurated on June 16, 2018.

References

External links 

 Biography of Georges Bellenger on the site of air base 105
 Biography of Georges Bellenger on the Aéro-mondo.fr site 

French military aviation
1878 births
1977 deaths
French aviators
Recipients of orders, decorations, and medals of Ethiopia